Moret may refer to:

 Didier Moret (b. 1975), Swiss ski mountaineer
 Isabelle Moret, Swiss politician
 Léon Moret (1890-1972), French geologist and paleontologist
 Norbert Moret, Swiss composer
 Neil Moret, pseudonym of composer Charles N. Daniels
 Roger Moret (1949–2020) Puerto Rican professional baseball player
 Segismundo Moret (1833–1913), Spanish politician and writer
 Moret (grape), another name for the French wine grape Gouget noir
 Moret (district) a former district in Ethiopia
 Moret-sur-Loing, a former commune in the Seine-et-Marne department in the Île-de-France region in north-central France